Simone Gavinet is a retired French slalom canoeist who competed in the mid-1950s. She won a silver medal in the mixed C-2 event at the 1955 ICF Canoe Slalom World Championships in Tacen.

References

French female canoeists
Living people
Year of birth missing (living people)
Medalists at the ICF Canoe Slalom World Championships